Jørgen Frandsen (born October 31, 1944) is a former Danish handball player who competed in the 1972 Summer Olympics and in the 1976 Summer Olympics.

He played his club handball with IF Stadion. In 1972, he was part of the Denmark men's national handball team which finished thirteenth in the 1972 Olympic tournament. He played three matches and scored one goal. Four years later, he finished eighth with the Danish team in the 1976 Olympic tournament. He played all six matches and scored two goals.

External links
Sports-Reference profile

1944 births
Living people
Danish male handball players
Olympic handball players of Denmark
Handball players at the 1972 Summer Olympics
Handball players at the 1976 Summer Olympics